Acetohalobium is a genus in the phylum Bacillota (Bacteria).

Etymology 
The name Acetohalobium derives from: Latin acetum, vinegar; Greek noun hals (ἅλς), salt; Greek bios (βίος), life; giving Acetohalobium, acetate-producing organism living in salt.

 Species 
The genus contains a single species, namely A. arabaticum ( Zhilina and Zavarzin 1990), type species of the genus; Latin arabaticum'', from Arabat, a peninsula between the Sea of Azov and Sivash.

See also 
 Bacterial taxonomy
 Microbiology
 List of bacterial orders
 List of bacteria genera

References 

Halanaerobiales
Monotypic bacteria genera
Bacteria genera